45 Herculis is a solitary variable star in the northern constellation Hercules. It has the Bayer designation l Herculis and the variable star designation V776 Herculis. The Flamsteed designation for this star comes from the publication Historia Coelestis Britannica by John Flamsteed. It is the 45th star in Flamsteed list of stars in the constellation Hercules, and is visible to the naked eye with a baseline apparent visual magnitude of 5.22. Parallax measurements show this star to be about 400 light-years away from the Solar System. It is moving closer to the Earth with a heliocentric radial velocity of −16 km/s.

Cowley et at. Both indicate this is a late B- or early A-type chemically peculiar, or Ap star, with abundance anomalies in chromium or silicon. It is an Alpha2 Canum Venaticorum variable that ranges in visual magnitude from 5.21 down to 5.27. The star has 2.9 times the mass of the Sun and 4.9 times the Sun's radius. It is radiating 120 times the Sun's luminosity from its photosphere at an effective temperature of 9,333 K.

References

A-type main-sequence stars
B-type main-sequence stars
Ap stars
Alpha2 Canum Venaticorum variables
Hercules (constellation)
Herculis, l
Durchmusterung objects
Herculis, 045
151525
082216
6234
Herculis, V776